The 1908 LSU Tigers football team represented the LSU Tigers of Louisiana State University during the 1908 college football season. The Tigers were coached by Edgar Wingard and posted a perfect 10–0 record, outscoring opponents 442 to 11. The team played its home games at State Field and competed as members of the Southern Intercollegiate Athletic Association (SIAA).

Triple threat quarterback Doc Fenton led the nation in points scored. The Tigers were retro-picked as co-national champion by the National Championship Foundation, and the NCAA recognizes LSU as national champion for that season along with Penn. However, LSU does not officially recognize this season as a national championship season.

The season was clouded by accusations of professionalism by Grantland Rice and rival school Tulane. The SIAA conducted an investigation that cleared LSU of any wrongdoing, but since many publications voted for the SIAA champion prior to the conclusion of the investigation, they did not recognize LSU's title.

Before the season
In 1908, football used a one-platoon system, with players featuring on offense, defense, and special teams. Also, the field was 110 yards in length, touchdowns were worth 5 points, and field goals earned 4 points. The team that scored a touchdown had the option to kickoff or receive. The ball was also much fatter.

The Tigers lost few players from the 1907 team and prospects were bright. Several members of the team came from Pennsylvania, including Doc Fenton, Mike Lally, John Seip, and coach Edgar Wingard. End Rowson "Little" Stovall and center Robert L. "Big" Stovall were brothers.

Lally and Fenton had both previously played for Mansfield Normal School, and Lally was one of the best blockers for Fenton. One of Fenton's favorite plays was the "tackle over tackle" play. In this play, Fenton faked a handoff to a back, then gave the ball to a tackle and led the blocking behind the other tackle. "Doc was the hub," recalled captain and tackle Marshall 'Cap' Gandy, "and we were the spokes." Fenton earned the reputation of doing everything well with a football.

Schedule

Season summary
LSU opened the season with two warm-up games, one against the Young Men's Gymnastic Club and the other Jackson Barracks-New Orleans.

Y. M. G. C.

LSU beat Tad Gormley's Young Men's Gymnastic Club, winning 41–0.

The starting lineup was: Seip (left end), Gandy (left tackle),  Pollock (left guard), R. L. Stovall (center), Hillman (right guard), Noblett (right tackle), Fenton (right end), Gill (quarterback), Stovall (left halfback), C. Smith (right halfback), and Lally (fullback).

Jackson Barracks-New Orleans

LSU swamped the Jackson Barracks-New Orleans 81–5. Fenton was switched to quarterback, swapping places at end with Reuben Gill. One account reads: "In Lally and Fenton the University has a pair that can hardly be equaled. In the game Fenton showed that he has lost none of his ability to dodge, his swiftness as a runner, his power as a punter and kicker, and his cool hard work. ... The two work splendidly together." The soldiers at Jackson Barracks made the only touchdown scored all season on the Tigers, when their halfback Culligan picked up a fumble and ran it back 105 yards. Captain Gandy once had a 40-yard touchdown, and Lally had one score of 60 yards.

Texas A&M

The Tigers beat the Texas A&M Aggies 26–0 at Pelican Park in New Orleans in the rain. The Aggies once ran the wrong way. 

The first scoring drive was highlighted by a 14-yard pass from Fenton to Little Stovall, and ended with a Stovall touchdown run around left end. On LSU's second scoring drive, Lally had  a 25-yard run, and Fenton eventually went around left end for the score. Before the half ended, Fenton kicked a 25-yard field goal from placement.

LSU's next touchdown came on a fumble recovery by Willie Hillman. The final touchdown was the most exciting, as Mike Lally had a 40-yard touchdown run around right end.

The starting lineup was: Gill (left end), Gandy (left tackle),  Pollock (left guard), Hillman (center), Thomas (right guard), Noblett (right tackle), Stovall (right end), Fenton (quarterback), C. Smith (left halfback), Lally (right halfback), and B. Smith (fullback).

Southwestern Presbyterian

Southwestern Presbyterian (today known as Rhodes College) fell to LSU 55–0.  SWPU did not make ten yards all day.

The starting lineup was: Stovall (left end), Gandy (left tackle),  Pollock (left guard), Hillman (center), Thomas (right guard), Noblett (right tackle), Gill (right end), Fenton (quarterback), C. Smith (left halfback), Lally (right halfback), and B. Smith (fullback).

Auburn

Undefeated LSU met undefeated Auburn for the top spot in the SIAA at the Auburn athletic field. LSU won 10–2, the only game it did not win by more than 20 points. 

The first touchdown came on a run from John Seip. Later in the half, Auburn's T. C. Locke blocked an LSU punt which was recovered by Fenton behind his own goal for a safety. According to one source, Fenton was knocked unconscious by a spectator's cane as he tried to get out of the end zone. LSU made the second score using conventional football.

"We won every game that fall except LSU," Auburn star Walker Reynolds told Clyde Bolton in 1973. "But LSU had a pro team."

The starting lineup was: Stovall (left end), Gandy (left tackle), Hillman (left guard), R. L. Stovall (center), Thomas (right guard), Noblett (right tackle), Seip (right end), Fenton (quarterback), Tally (left halfback), C. Smith (right halfback), and B. Smith (fullback).

Mississippi A&M

LSU won easily over the Mississippi Aggies 50–0, using substitutes by the end of the game.

The first score occurred after five and-a-half minutes had passed, Clarence Smith going through right tackle. LSU then scored a safety by tackling the Aggies punter. Seip then went around end for another touchdown. On the next drive, Seip went 20 yards on a cross play, Fenton hit Seip with a forward pass for 8 yards, and Bob Smith then scored on a trick play. Clarence Smith then got another touchdown, of 25 yards. The highlight of the game followed as Fenton had a 95-yard kick return for a touchdown.

In the second half, Fenton went 30 yards for another touchdown on a return. Gill went around left end for another touchdown. Fenton went 40 yards for the next touchdown. The last touchdown came from Clarence Smith.

The starting lineup was: Seip (left end), Gandy (left tackle), Hillman (left guard), R. L. Stovall (center), Pollock (right guard), Noblett (right tackle), Stovall (right end), Fenton (quarterback), C. Smith (left halfback), Lally (right halfback), and B. Smith (fullback).

Baylor

The Tigers romped 89–0 over Baylor, the second highest score in school history. The highlight of the contest was Mike Lally's 105-yard return for a touchdown. Pat Ryan also had a 75-yard touchdown run.

After the game, Baylor's coach Enoch J. Mills said: "You have, without any doubt, the strongest team in the South by far. The playing of your team here was something wonderful. We were simply badly beaten. You could run up as large a score on Tulane as you did against us without any trouble."

The starting lineup was: Stovall (left end), Gandy (left tackle), Pollock (left guard), R. L. Stovall (center), Hillman (right guard), Neblett (right tackle), Seip (right end), Fenton (quarterback), I. Smith (left halfback), Lally (right halfback), and C. Smith (fullback).

Haskell

LSU defeated the Haskell Indians, 32–0, outweighing the Indians and needing little strategy.

Clarence Smith bucked the line for 15 yards and the first touchdown. Fenton later added a 30-yard field goal.

In the second half, Gandy made a touchdown on the "tackle over tackle" play; Bob Smith made another. Clarence Smith made his second touchdown of the day around right end. The final score was a 32-yard end run by Mike Lally.

The starting lineup was: Stovall (left end), Gandy (left tackle), Pollock (left guard), R. L. Stovall (center), Hillman (right guard), Neblett (right tackle), Seip (right end), Fenton (quarterback), C. Smith (left halfback), Lally (right halfback), and B. Smith (fullback).

Louisiana Industrial

The Tigers beat Louisiana Industrial of Ruston, 22–0. Fenton was the star of the game, with two interceptions for touchdowns.

The starting lineup was: Stovall (left end), Gandy (left tackle), Thomas (left guard), Hillman (center), Pollock (right guard), Noblett (right tackle), Seip (right end), Fenton (quarterback), C. Smith (left halfback), Lally (right halfback), and B. Smith (fullback).

Arkansas

LSU defeated Arkansas 36–4, with Fenton's runs and kicks featuring throughout. The crowd was the largest ever to see a football game in Arkansas.

LSU made three touchdowns in the game's first four minutes. On the Tigers' first possession, Fenton went 22 yards around right end and Lally then went 40 yards for  a touchdown. On the ensuing Arkansas possession, Fenton intercepted a pass and returned it 45 yards for the score. Big Stovall made the third touchdown on an onside kick from scrimmage. LSU also had touchdowns using a triple pass and a double pass.

Arkansas got its points after a 35-yard pass from a fake field goal led to a field goal from the 30-yard line.  Fenton had the lone score of the second half, on a 55-yard run and fake pass.

The starting lineup was: Stovall (left end), Gandy (left tackle), Thomas (left guard), R. L. Stovall (center), Hillman (right guard), Noblett (right tackle), Seip (right end), Fenton (quarterback), C. Smith (left halfback), Lally (right halfback), and B. Smith (fullback).

Postseason

Disputed title
The season was clouded by accusations of professionalism by Grantland Rice and rival school Tulane. Rice claimed V. Smith, C. Smith, Seip, Fenton, Lally, and Gandy were all paid salaries to play football, and that Clarke was a former All-Western player. Amidst fears of many players being ineligible under SIAA rules, most sportswriters instead gave the Southern title to Auburn, and left LSU players off their All-Southern team. A subsequent SIAA investigation cleared LSU of any wrongdoing, but since many publications voted for the SIAA champion prior to the conclusion of the investigation, they did not recognize LSU's title.

Awards and honors
Fans presented coach Wingard and referee James Halligan with gold-handled umbrellas.

Fenton's 125 points (132 by modern rules) led the nation in scoring. He had a school record 36 extra points and 6 field goals. Fenton, Lally, and Willie Hillman were selected All-Southern by Nash Buckingham in the Memphis Commercial Appeal.

Legacy
The 1908 team is said to be LSU's first great team, and was considered the greatest until 1958.

Fenton and Seip were nominated, though not selected, for an Associated Press All-Time Southeast 1869–1919 era team. Fenton, Lally, Seip, and Noblett made the first-team of an all-time LSU team selected in 1935. According to Tony Barnhart, Fenton is considered the first great football player in LSU history. The National Football Foundation selected Fenton as the retroactive Heisman Trophy winner of 1908.

Personnel

Roster

Roster from LSU: The Louisiana Tigers

Scoring leaders
The following is an incomplete list of statistics and scores, largely dependent on newspaper summaries.

Staff
Coach: Edgar Wingard
Manager: R. L. Himes

See also
 List of undefeated NCAA Division I football teams

Notes

References

Additional sources
 

LSU
LSU Tigers football seasons
College football national champions
College football undefeated seasons
LSU Tigers football